William 'Willie' Devlin (born 30 May 1931) is a Scottish footballer, who played for Peterborough, Carlisle and Dumbarton.

References

External links

1931 births
Scottish footballers
Dumbarton F.C. players
Scottish Football League players
Living people
Peterborough United F.C. players
Carlisle United F.C. players
English Football League players
Association football wingers
Footballers from Glasgow